Cheiracanthium taprobanense is a species of spider of the genus Cheiracanthium. It is endemic to Sri Lanka.

See also 
 List of Eutichuridae species

References

taprobanense
Endemic fauna of Sri Lanka
Spiders of Asia
Spiders described in 1907